Coleophora struella is a moth of the family Coleophoridae. It is found in France and on the Iberian Peninsula.

The larvae feed on Lavandula and Thymus vulgaris. They create a conical, light brown to greyish lobe case. The lobes are large and very neatly arranged transversely. Full-grown cases are found in April and May.

References

struella
Moths of Europe
Moths described in 1859